Helmut Rohde (9 November 1925 – 16 April 2016) was a German politician who served as federal minister of education and science from 1974 to 1978.

Early life and education
Rohde was born in Hanover on 9 November 1925. His father, August, was a welder and a social democrat member of the independent trade union. Helmut Rohde fought in the German army in World War II and was prisoned until 1945 when he was freed.

He studied journalism following the war and graduated in 1947. In 1950, he began to study politics and business in a higher education institution in Wilhelmshaven, which later became part of the University of Göttingen.

Career
In 1945, Rohde became a member of the Social Democratic Party (SPD). After graduation he began to work as an editor at the German Press Agency's Hannover branch. His pseudonym in his writings was Achilles, the name of his grandfather. He served in the party's local organizations in Hannover in the 1950s and later served in its "working group for workers' questions". In 1957, he was elected to the Bundestag with the SPD from Hannover. From 1964 to 1965 he was also a member of the European Parliament.

He was appointed federal minister of education and science on 16 May 1974, replacing Klaus von Dohnanyi in the post. He served in the cabinet led by Prime Minister Helmut Schmidt. In 1975, Rohde became a member of the SPD's executive committee. Rohde's cabinet post ended on 16 February 1978 and another SPD politician, Jürgen Schmude, replaced him in the post. After leaving office he concentrated on his work in the SPD's working group for workers' questions.

In 1985, Rohde began to work as a lecturer at Leibniz University Hannover and the University of Bochum. In 1994, he was named as an honorary professor of the University of Bremen.

Later years
Rohde lived in a nursing home near Bonn. He died on 16 April 2016, aged 90.

References

External links

20th-century German journalists
1925 births
2016 deaths
Politicians from Hanover
University of Göttingen alumni
German male journalists
Members of the Bundestag for Lower Saxony
Social Democratic Party of Germany MEPs
Education ministers of Germany
Academic staff of the University of Bremen
Academic staff of the University of Hanover
Academic staff of Ruhr University Bochum
German male writers
Grand Crosses with Star and Sash of the Order of Merit of the Federal Republic of Germany
Members of the Bundestag for the Social Democratic Party of Germany